Marcus Dunstan is an American screenwriter and director who, along with Patrick Melton, wrote screenplay for the film Feast, which was the winner of Season Three of the filmmaking competition reality TV series Project Greenlight. Dunstan has since written the screenplays for Feast, Feast II: Sloppy Seconds,  Feast III: The Happy Finish, The Collector, The Collection, Saw IV, Saw V, Saw VI, and Saw 3D, and in some cases, making cameo appearances in those films as well.

Early life
Dunstan was born in Macomb, Illinois. He spent his formative years working in movie theaters and studying film at the University of Iowa.

While in college Dunstan experimented with 16mm film often using himself as the guinea pig in poorly executed stunts that left him dragging behind a car, the target of flying knives, and thrice being set on fire. He holds the record for spilling the most fake blood ever in a student film. Since moving to Los Angeles in 1999, Dunstan toiled in several odd jobs including a retirement home, an Optometry clinic, and a video store while spending his nights writing on a computer borrowed from fellow screenwriter, Patrick Melton.

Career
In March 2005, Dunstan and Melton won Season Three of Project Greenlight with their screenplay, Feast, which was directed by John Gulager. The film starred Krista Allen and Eric Dane, and was produced by Dimension Films and Neo Art & Logic.

Dunstan has written the screenplays for Feast, Feast II: Sloppy Seconds,  Feast III: The Happy Finish, The Collector, Saw IV, Saw V, Saw VI, and Saw 3D. He is also in pre-production and post-production for several of his other screenplays. In addition to writing the screenplay for The Collector, he directed the film. He also directed the sequel to The Collector, titled The Collection. The film, produced by Liddell Entertainment and Fortress Features, was released in 2012.

In addition to writing and directing, he and writing partner Patrick Melton have made cameo appearances in Saw V, Supergator, Feast, and The Collector, appearing in the later two through the same puppet show clip shown on TV screens. He, Melton, and Stephen Romano co-wrote the thriller novel Black Light - Don't Look Too Deep, which was published on October 5, 2011, over Mulholland Books as hardcover. The novel will adapt in a feature film written by Melton and Dunstan, under the direction of Romano, Michael De Luca will produce for Warner Bros. Dunstan co-wrote with Patrick Melton a screenplay for potential eleventh film of the Halloween franchise.

In 2013, Melton and Dunstan were enlisted to perform uncredited rewrites on Pacific Rim when their spec script Monstropolis caught Guillermo del Toro's attention, and then were attached to a film version of God of War. In October 2016, Dunstan, along with partner Melton, were selected to write for the adaptation of Brandon Sanderson's The Way of Kings. He also wrote additional dialogue for the Saw Escape Room in Las Vegas.

Filmography

Film

References

External links

Living people
Horror film directors
American male screenwriters
People from Macomb, Illinois
University of Iowa alumni
Film directors from Illinois
Screenwriters from Illinois
Year of birth missing (living people)